San Lázaro is a station on the Mexico City Metro. It is located in the Venustiano Carranza borough of Mexico City. It lies along Lines 1 and B. The station was opened on 5 September 1969.  The station was designed by Félix Candela and consists of interlocked hyperbolic paraboloidal or saddle roof sections. Starting 11 July 2022, the Line 1 station will remain closed for at least eight months for modernization work on the tunnel and the line's technical equipment.

General information
The station logo depicts an old steam locomotive. Near the site of the metro station stood the San Lázaro mainline train station. San Lázaro was the main terminus for the Interoceanic Railway, which linked the port of Veracruz, on the Gulf of Mexico, with the Pacific Ocean. Today, some railway tracks can still be seen near the metro station, but nothing more.

Nearby is the building that houses the Chamber of Deputies ("Palacio Legislativo" in Spanish), the lower house of the Mexican Congress (Congreso de la Unión).

San Lázaro metro station is connected with TAPO, Mexico City's Eastern intercity bus station. This bus station serves states including Puebla, Veracruz, Oaxaca, and Yucatán. It is used by some of the most prestigious and safest bus lines in Mexico, such as ADO, UNO, and Maya de Oro.

Nearby
Terminal de Autobuses de Pasajeros de Oriente, bus terminal.
Palacio Legislativo de San Lázaro, main seat of the legislative power of the Mexican government.
Archivo General de la Nación, General Archive of the Nation.
Palacio de Lecumberri, former prison, now housing the Archivo General de la Nación.

Exits

Line 1
Southwest: Avenida Zaragoza and Eje 3 Oriente Ing. Eduardo Molina, Colonia 10 de mayo
Southeast: Terminal de Autobuses de Pasajeros de Oriente, Colonia 10 de mayo

Line B
Avenida Ing. Eduardo Molina, Colonia 7 de julio

Ridership

References

External links 
 

San Lazaro
Railway stations opened in 1969
1999 establishments in Mexico
Félix Candela buildings
1969 establishments in Mexico
Railway stations opened in 1999
Mexico City Metro Line B stations
Mexico City Metro stations in Venustiano Carranza, Mexico City
Accessible Mexico City Metro stations